Maria Dickons or Martha Frances Caroline Poole (1770s – 4 May 1833) was an opera singer.

Life
Martha Frances Caroline Poole was born to a large family in the early 1770s or thereabouts. Her father, William, recognised her musical talents as a singer and harpsichordist.

Dickons received her training under Venanzio Rauzzini and she appeared in one of his operas, La vestale, in 1787 at the King's Theatre and then at Vauxhall Gardens. By the time she married in 1800 she had appeared in Dublin, Edinburgh and Covent Garden where she had been paid eight pounds per annum.

Unfortunately her new husband's trading was not as successful as her singing so she returned to the stage for financial reasons in 1807. She and her husband separated in 1810.  Between 1807 and 1815 she appeared at prime locations in London, but her forays to Paris and Italy met with undocumented or mixed success. It is suspected that she was demoted in Venice, but she used her time valuably and she created a large multi-volume collection of Italian vocal music which she brought back to Britain.

Dickons returned to Covent Garden to work with Henry Bishop in his popularised operas in 1818 and 1819 and she then retired again.

Dickons died at her home in Regent Street in 1833.

References

1770s births
1833 deaths
18th-century British women opera singers
19th-century British women opera singers